The National Organ and Chamber Music Hall of Ukraine (Ukrainian: Національний будинок органної та камерної музики України) is a cultural institution in Kyiv, Ukraine. It is located at the St. Nicholas Cathedral which it shares with the Roman Catholic Church of Ukraine. A hall of the church was rebuilt as a concert hall in February 1980.

Building
The St. Nicholas Cathedral was completed  to accommodate the growing Polish community in Kyiv.  It was closed by the Communists after 1917, used for storage in the 1930s and later as an archive. The building suffered heavy damage during the Second World War.

In the late 1970s, the Council of Ministers of the Ukrainian SSR decided to restore the building as the National Organ and Chamber Music Hall for the Ukrainian Ministry of Culture. The work was overseen by architects O. Grauzhis and I. Tukalevskiy, with stained-glass windows from the Baltics, upholstered furniture from Lviv, and parquet flooring from Kivertsi.

From 1992, the building has been shared with the Roman Catholic Church of Ukraine. The Ministry of Culture plans to construct a new building for the Organ and Chamber Music Hall by 2023.

Organs
The main organ was designed and built for the concert hall by Rieger–Kloss in 1979. The organ has a wide timbre palette, allowing performance of works of different styles and directions.

A rehearsal organ, also crafted by Rieger–Kloss in 1979, has 56 keys in two manuals and a 30-key pedal. Its 8 registers have a wide distribution, allowing some imitation in preparation for performance with the large organ.

Creative teams

The creative team of the National Organ and Chamber Music Hall include the  Borys Lyatoshynsky ensemble, "Ravisan" trio, Mykola Lysenko quartet, the Kyiv and Kyiv Brass chamber ensembles, organists, soloist-instrumentalists, and singers.

Artistic directors of the institution include:
Prof.  (1981–1986)
Alexander Kostin (1987–1997)

Notable performers 
  (organist) – People's Artist of Ukraine
  (organist) – People's Artist of Ukraine
Balakhovska Valeria Valeriyivna (organist) – Honored Artist of Ukraine
Kharechko Iryna Ivanivna (organist) – Honored Artist of Ukraine
Sidorenko Maksym Ivanovych (organist) – Honored Artist of Ukraine
Bubnova Anna (organist) – Honored Artist of Ukraine
 (organist)

References

Concert halls in Ukraine
Music in Kyiv
Musical groups from Kyiv
Musical groups established in 1980
1980 establishments in Ukraine
Institutions with the title of National in Ukraine